Dawn of the Planet of the Apes is a 2014 American science fiction film directed by Matt Reeves and written by Mark Bomback, Rick Jaffa and Amanda Silver. It stars Andy Serkis, Jason Clarke, Gary Oldman, Keri Russell, Toby Kebbell, Kodi Smit-McPhee, and Kirk Acevedo. It is the sequel to the 2011 film Rise of the Planet of the Apes, which began 20th Century Fox's reboot of the original Planet of the Apes series. The film grossed $208,545,589 in the US & Canada and $500,290,000 in other countries, for a worldwide total of $708,835,589.

Awards and nominations

References

External links
 

Dawn of the Planet of the Apes
Planet of the Apes